Brown Island is an island on the West Canada Creek in Herkimer County, New York. It is located south of Newport.

References

Islands of New York (state)
Islands of Herkimer County, New York
River islands of New York (state)